von Ettingshausen is a surname. Notable people with the surname include:

Albert von Ettingshausen (1850–1932), Austrian physicist
Andreas von Ettingshausen (1796–1878), German mathematician and physicist
Colin von Ettingshausen (born 1971), German rower
Constantin von Ettingshausen (1826–1897), Austrian geologist and botanist